Andrea Arrighini (born 6 June 1990) is an Italian footballer who plays for  club Pro Vercelli on loan from Reggiana.

Biography
Born in Pisa, Tuscany, Arrighini had played 3 times for Lombard club Lumezzane in 2006–07 Serie C2. In 2007 Arrighini returned to Tuscany for Serie D club Pontedera.

He followed the club promoted to 2012–13 Lega Pro Seconda Divisione. He scored 17 times for the Group B runner-up. In 2013–14 Lega Pro Prima Divisione, he scored 15 times.

Avellino
On 27 June 2014 Arrighini signed a 4-year contract with Serie B club Avellino. On 11 January 2015 Arrighini was farmed to Lega Pro club Pisa in temporary deal, with an option to purchase.

On 9 July Arrighini was signed by another third division club Cosenza in the same formula.

Alessandria
On 28 July 2019, he signed a 3-year contract with Alessandria.

Reggiana
On 26 January 2022, he moved to Reggiana. On 1 September 2022, Arrighini was loaned by Pro Vercelli.

References

External links
 Lega Serie B profile 

1990 births
Sportspeople from Pisa
Footballers from Tuscany
Living people
Italian footballers
Association football forwards
F.C. Lumezzane V.G.Z. A.S.D. players
U.S. Città di Pontedera players
U.S. Avellino 1912 players
Pisa S.C. players
Cosenza Calcio players
A.S. Cittadella players
A.C. Carpi players
U.S. Alessandria Calcio 1912 players
A.C. Reggiana 1919 players
F.C. Pro Vercelli 1892 players
Serie B players
Serie C players